The Moses Taft House is a historic house at 111 East Wallum Lake Road in Burrillville, Rhode Island.  The -story side-gable Cape style house was built in 1786, and is a well-preserved example of early Federal architecture.  It exhibits the typical five-bay facade, with the entry in the center bay, and a large central chimney.  The house underwent a major restoration in the 2000s.  Moses Taft, an early owner of the house, was a farmer and operated a nearby grist mill on the Clear River, with Seth Ross, who
resided on Eagle Peak Road.

Moses Taft, a 19th-century resident of Uxbridge, Massachusetts, spent time with Samuel W. Scott in Burrillville, but this house is not his namesake, it was built 26 years prior to his birth.

The house was listed on the National Register of Historic Places in 2009.

See also
 National Register of Historic Places listings in Providence County, Rhode Island
 Moses Taft House (Uxbridge, Massachusetts), former home of Moses Taft, a 19th-century American industrialist

References

Houses on the National Register of Historic Places in Rhode Island
Federal architecture in Rhode Island
Houses completed in 1786
Houses in Providence County, Rhode Island
Burrillville, Rhode Island
National Register of Historic Places in Providence County, Rhode Island
1786 establishments in Rhode Island